Sampath Tennakoon (20 June 1959 – 3 December 2021: සම්පත් තෙන්නකෝන් [Sinhala]), was an actor in Sri Lankan cinema, theater and television.

Personal life
Sampath Tennakoon was born on 20 June 1959. He was from Isipathana College, Colombo.

He was married to fellow actress Rathna Lalani Jayakody. They first met during a stage drama Puthra Samagama and then in Suba Sandewak. They have acted in more than 50 stage dramas together. Geetha Kanthi Jayakody is the sister of Rathna Lalani, who is a renowned award-winning actress in Sri Lankan cinema, theater and television. Popular actress Paboda Sandeepani is the daughter of her sister Geetha Kanthi. Popular actor Bimal Jayakody is the son of Rathna's elder brother. Bimal is married to fellow actress Sujani Menaka.

Tennakoon died on 3 December 2021, at the age of 62 while receiving treatment for lung cancer at a private hospital in Colombo. At his request, the funeral reportedly took place within 24 hours.

Acting career
Neil Alles' acting is what makes Sampath, who has experienced the school stage, a passion for acting. Tennakoon usually went to Lumbini Theater to watch stage dramas. He first acted in the play Guru Lipi  directed by Dayaratne Ratagedara and then in Ambu Samiyo by Douglas Siriwardena. He made his television debut with the children's teledrama Moragiri Kanda directed by Sisira Kotelawala. He acted in teledramas such as Sneha, Verona and Maha Viru Pandu.

In 2013, Rathna and Sampath organized a drama festival titled Abhinayana Sampath-Rathna Rangabhumika to celebrate their 30 years of stage drama career. They staged seven popular dramas from 17 to 23 December 2013 at New Town Hall, Colombo 7, in which they together acted.

Selected stage dramas

 6457 (Sixty Four Fifty Seven)
 Deseeya Thunseeya
 Eka-Adhipathi
 Guru Tharuwa
 Jagan Ma
 Mala Walalu
 Mayadevi
 Puthra Samagama
 Romaya Gini Gani
 Romaya Gini Gani 2
 Suba Sandewak
 Sudu Redi Horu
 Thalamala Pipila

Filmography
His maiden cinematic experience came through a minor role in 1990 film Hima Gira, directed by Vijaya Dharma Sri. Since then, he had acted in about 12 films, mostly in supportive characters.

References

1959 births
2021 deaths
People from Colombo
Sri Lankan male television actors
Sri Lankan male film actors
Sinhalese male actors
Sri Lankan male stage actors